Donna... cosa si fa per te (Woman ... what do you do for you), is a 1976 Italian comedy film directed by Giuliano Biagetti.

Plot   
A rich Tuscan aristocrat allows himself to be seduced by a beautiful woman to whom he gives a ride. The girl tries to move him with phoney and pathetic family stories, hiding she is actually a prostitute.

Cast 
 Renzo Montagnani: Count Cecco Balducci
 Jenny Tamburi: Sole
 Enzo Liberti: Man from Rome 
 Filippo De Gara:	Count Mondino Altoviti 
 Maria Pia Conte:  Countess Altoviti 
 Raf Luca: 	Gargiulo
 Franca Scagnetti

See also    
 List of Italian films of 1976

References

External links

1976 films
1976 comedy films
1970s Italian-language films
Films directed by Giuliano Biagetti
Italian comedy films
Films scored by Berto Pisano
1970s Italian films